The Center for Economic Progress (CEP) is a non-profit organization based in Chicago that offers free tax preparation and financial services to low-income families.

Services
As part of the IRS Volunteer Income Tax Assistance Program, CEP provides free tax preparation at sites in Chicago and surrounding Illinois during tax season to families that earn under $50,000 annually or individuals who earn under $25,000. It also promoted the 2010 US Census at its tax sites in neighborhoods that showed especially low response rates in 2000.

CEP employs approximately 50 staff members and recruits more than one thousand volunteer tax preparers each year.

References

Charities based in Illinois
Non-profit organizations based in Chicago
Organizations established in 1990
1990 establishments in Illinois